, compiled in 1650 by Shō Shōken, is the first official history of the Ryūkyū Kingdom. In six scrolls, the main text occupies five and an accompanying summary the sixth. Unlike later official histories such as Chūzan Seifu and Kyūyō, which were written in kanbun, Chūzan Seikan is largely written in Japanese, other than for the summary and a number of quotes in Chinese.

The account of Shō Nei, whose reign saw invasion and subjugation by Satsuma, opens with the statement that the kingdom had been in subordinate vassal status to the Shimazu clan since the Eikyō era. The account of the siring of Shunten by Minamoto no Tametomo was similarly exploited during the Meiji period and after to help legitimize the annexation of the kingdom and its reconfiguration first as the Ryūkyū Domain and subsequently as Okinawa Prefecture.

See also
 List of Cultural Properties of Japan - writings (Okinawa)
 Okinawa Shrine

References

Japanese chronicles
Ryukyu Kingdom
1650 books
Edo-period history books